Puchenau is a municipality in the district of Urfahr-Umgebung in the Austrian state of Upper Austria. Until 1893 it was part of the neighbouring town of Ottensheim.

Population

References

Cities and towns in Urfahr-Umgebung District